Mediatization may refer to:

 Mediatization (media), the influence and interaction of mass media with other sectors of society
 German mediatisation, German historical territorial restructuring